The Division of Riverina-Darling was an Australian Electoral Division in the state of New South Wales. It was located in south-west rural New South Wales, and included the towns of Broken Hill, Griffith, Hay and Narrandera.  The Division was created in 1984, largely replacing the abolished division of Riverina. Its name indicated its relationship with Riverina and the seat of Darling, abolished in 1969.

Riverina-Darling had a notional Labor majority on its creation.  However, it included most of the old Riverina, and was thus a natural choice for that seat's member, Noel Hicks of the National Party, to transfer for the 1984 election.  Hicks overcame the Labor majority to win in 1984, and continued to fend off spirited challenges from Labor until it was abolished in 1993.  Broken Hill was transferred to Parkes, while most of its remaining territory became a recreated Riverina, which became a safe National seat as a result.

Members

Election results

Former electoral divisions of Australia
Constituencies established in 1984
1984 establishments in Australia
Constituencies disestablished in 1993
1993 disestablishments in Australia